The 1860 United States presidential election in Michigan took place on November 6, 1860, as part of the 1860 United States presidential election. Voters chose six representatives, or electors, to the Electoral College, who voted for president and vice president.

Michigan was won by Illinois Representative Abraham Lincoln (R–Kentucky), running with Senator Hannibal Hamlin, with 57.23% of the popular vote, against Senator Stephen A. Douglas (D–Vermont), running with 41st Governor of Georgia Herschel V. Johnson, with 43.97% of the popular vote.

The 1860 presidential election in Michigan began a trend in which the state would vote the same as Pennsylvania, as the two states would vote in lockstep with each other on all but three occasions since Lincoln’s victory - 1932, 1940, and 1976.

Results

See also
 United States presidential elections in Michigan

References

Michigan
1860
1860 Michigan elections